Carpentaria, Carpenteria, or Carpinteria may refer to:

Plants
 Carpentaria (Carpentaria acuminata), a palm native to tropical coastal regions in the north of Northern Territory, Australia
 Carpenteria, also known as the tree-anemone or bush-anemone, a flowering plant endemic to California

Places

 Carpentaria, Queensland, a locality in north-western Queensland
 Gulf of Carpentaria, adjacent to Queensland and the Northern Territory, Australia
 Shire of Carpentaria, a local government area in Queensland, Australia
 Carpinteria, California, USA
 Carpinteria (Amtrak station), an Amtrak rail station in the city of Carpinteria, California
 Carpintería, San Luis, Argentina

Other
 Carpentaria (novel), a 2006 novel by Alexis Wright
 HMAS Carpentaria, a Royal Australian Navy base at Thursday Island, Torres Strait Islands
 Carpentaria, an unmanned Australian lightvessel (a floating lighthouse) built during 1916-17 and in service to 1985
 Carpenteria (foram), a genus of Foraminifera in the family Victoriellidae, in the superfamily Planorbulinacea